Victoria Kimani (born 28 July 1985) is a Kenyan singer, songwriter, and entertainer previously signed to Nigerian record label Chocolate City. Her debut album was released in 2016.

She has appeared in the film 7 Inch Curve.

Life and career 
Kimani attributes that she began her career doing back-ups for Mercy Myra. By it involving considerable travel, she later opted to drop out of school to fully pursue a career in music.

In late 2012, she was the first female artist signed by the Chocolate City music label, releasing her first single under the label, "Mtoto", in March 2013. The video was shot in Los Angeles.

Between 2014 and 2016, Kimani released the single "Show", produced by singer and producer Tekno Miles and other singles such as;  "Vex"; "Two of Dem"; "Loving You"; and "Booty Bounce", featuring Tanzanian artists Diamond Platnumz and Ommy Dimpoz; in 2016, Kimani released her new single "All the Way", featuring Khuli Chana.

On 13 May 2015, Kimani and seven African female musicians, Cobhams Asuquo and a team of One Campaign staff met in Johannesburg to create "Strong Girl". The song features singers Waje (Nigeria), Vanessa Mdee (Tanzania), Arielle T (Gabon), Gabriela (Mozambique), Yemi Alade (Nigeria), Selmor Mtukudzi (Zimbabwe), Judith Sephuma (South Africa), Blessing Nwafor (South Africa) and  actress Omotola Jalade Ekeinde (Nigeria).

Kimani released the album Safari in December 2017, which collaborated with other African artists: Sarkodie, Khuli Chana, Jesse Jagz, Phyno and Ice Prince.

In December 2017, in an interview with Adelle Onyango and Shaffie Weru on a radio interview, Kimani revealed that her contract with Chocolate City had expired, and felt it was time for her to be an independent artist.

Discography 
Studio albums
Safari (2017)

Awards and nominations

References

External links 
 Victoria Kimani - MistariYetu
 Victoria Kimani – Wash It ft. Sarkodie

1985 births
Living people
21st-century Kenyan women singers
21st-century Kenyan actresses
American people of Kenyan descent
Feminist musicians
Kenyan Christians
Kenyan feminists
Kenyan film actresses
Kikuyu people
People from Nairobi